House of Dilip Kumar, Peshawar housed the Indian film actor Dilip Kumar.

It was named as a Pakistani national heritage monument on 13 July 2014 by the Pakistani Prime Minister Nawaz Sharif.

Kumar visited his house once and sentimentally kissed the soil. In 1988, he visited Peshawar and in an interview given at the PC Hotel fondly recalled the days of his childhood and growing up, lapsing into Hindko and Pashto time to time.

In 1997, when he was awarded Nishan-e-Imtiaz, Pakistan's highest civilian honor, he was unable to reach the house because of uncontrollable crowds. The government had been trying to acquire the house.

Location
The house is located in the Qissa Khawani Bazaar of Peshawar, Khyber Pakhtunkhwa, Pakistan.

Acquisition
On 13 July 2013, Nawaz Sharif directed the ministry of information, broadcasting and national heritage to acquire the house. The order was forwarded to the director general of Pakistan National Council of Arts (PNCA) for implementation. According to media sources, the move was intended to promote the cultural India-Pakistan relations.

Conversion to museum
The Pakistani government planned to convert the site into a museum after acquisition. Planning was also being made to invite Dilip Kumar and other members of his family.

On 26 July 2014, the house was declared as a "protected monument" under the Antiquity Act of 1997.

Dilip Kumar and the Kapoor family
Both growing up in Peshawar and in Bombay, Dilip Kumar and his family had close friendly relationship with the Kapoors. In his autobiography, The Substance And The Shadow, Kumar writes: “We were living in undivided India at the time and there was a sizeable Hindu population. Men as well as women mingled freely with Muslims in the market square, wishing each other and exchanging pleasantries ever so cheerfully. Aghaji (my father), had many Hindu friends, and one of them was Basheshwarnathji, who held an important job in the civil services. His elder son came to our house with him a few times and he stunned the ladies with his handsome appearances. That was Raj Kapoor’s father Prithviraj Kapoor.”

See also

 Chunnamal Haveli 
 Ghalib ki Haveli
 Haveli of Nau Nihal Singh
 Kapoor Haveli, ancestral house of the Kapoor family of Bollywood in Peshawar, also in same locality
 Shekhawati

References

External links
 House of Dilip Kumar Facebook

Mausoleums in Khyber Pakhtunkhwa
History of Khyber Pakhtunkhwa
Monuments and memorials in Khyber Pakhtunkhwa
Buildings and structures in Khyber Pakhtunkhwa
Archaeological sites in Khyber Pakhtunkhwa